KQMY may refer to:

 KMKV (FM), a radio station (100.7FM) licensed to serve Kihei, Hawaii, United States, which held the call sign KQMY from 2015 to 2017
 KMGW (FM), a radio station (99.3 FM) licensed to serve Naches, Washington, United States, which held the call sign KQMY from 2008 to 2012